Muamalat (also muʿāmalāt,  literally "transactions" or "dealings") is a part of Islamic jurisprudence,  or fiqh. Sources agree that muamalat includes Islamic "rulings governing commercial transactions" and Majallah al-Ahkam al-Adliyyah).
 
However, other sources (Oxford Islamic Studies Online, Brian Kettell, and Wahbah al-Zuhayli’) give it a broader definition including civil acts and in general all aspects of fiqh that are not Ibadat (acts of ritual worship such as prayer or fasting). (See organizational chart of the structure of Islam below in "Principles" section.)

Mu'amalat provides much of the basis for  Islamic economics,  and the instruments of Islamic financing, and deals not only with Islamic legality but also social and economic repercussions and the rationale of its prohibitions (according to Monzer Kahf).  Even a broad definition of Muamalat does not deal with all aspects of property and money in Islam, as zakat — compulsory alms giving that is one of the five pillars of Islam — is part of Ibadat division of fiqh.

Definitions

commercial and civil acts or dealings under Islamic law, (Oxford Islamic Studies Online); 
what involves acts of interaction and exchange of sureties and sales (Oxford Dictionary of Islam);
“the knowledge of Shariah rulings that relates to the practical aspects of a mukallaf (an accountable Muslim, i.e. an adult and mentally competent) in the area of business and financial dealings and derived from its detailed evidences.” (Abdullaah Jalil, Asharaf Mohd Ramli, Syahidawati Shahwan. Based on the definition of fiqh established by the founder of the Shafi'i school of fiqh, Al-Shafi‘i (204 AH))
all engagements that take place in business, ("corporate sharia elite" according to Patricia Sloane-White);
Islamic jurisprudence of transactions, and the principles upon which Islamic finance is based (M.R. Ab`Aziz); also the study of "the legal framework within which economic transactions are conducted in an Islamic society" and that "determines their contracts" (Monzer Kahf); 
that aspect of Islamic jurisprudence that deals with civil obligations, (Jamal J. Nasir);
"any form of mutual dealings held between men to solve their everyday needs, especially in matters relating to trade and commerce"; also "a social relationship which consists of various economic and non-economic activities." (Takaful Basic Examination of Islamic Banking and Finance Institute of Malaysia).

According to at least one author (Monzer Kahf), Mu'amalat "sets terms and conditions of conduct for economic and financial relationships in the Islamic economy" and provides the "grounds on which new instruments" of Islamic financing are developed. It also extends beyond discussions of Islamic legality "to the social and economic repercussions of alternative legal forms of economic or financial relationship and analyze the rationale behinds [sic] it."

Principles 

According to Hosein Askar, Zamir Iqbal, and Abbas Mirakhor, a "significant subset" of muamalat "defines the conduct of economic activities" within the economic system, which "ultimately lays down  the rules for commercial, financial and banking system."

Basic principles  
According to Aznan Hasan, basic principles of muamalat, are that dealings and contracts in Islam ...
are permissible until evidence is given proving otherwise; 
must be based on mutual consent; 
must be in accordance with the maqasid (goals of) al shariah; 
should facilitate the circulation of wealth and property; 
should be transparent; 
must observe justice and fair dealing.

Theories of Muamalat
According to Abdullaah Jalil, Asharaf Mohd Ramli, Syahidawati Shahwan  there are four "theories" that underlie the framework of Mu'amalat dealings:
Ahliyyah (Legal Capacity). Legal capacity refers to whether the person is of sound mind and old enough (puberty) to enter into a legal financial contract.   
Mal (Property) concerns the nature and types of property that the contract deal with.
Property must exist at the time of transaction
seller must be owner of the merchandise
merchandise must be Islamically lawful
must be of some use or value
must be able to be delivered by the seller to the buyer
the details of the merchandise must be known to both the seller and buyer   
Milkiyyah (Ownership), concerns the types, methods and scopes of ownership, that affect the relationship between the property and its owner in Islamic jurisprudence. 
'Aqd (Contract), describes the framework or structure of a contract in fiqh.

Jalil, Ramli and Shahwan also note that the development of Mu'amalat rules is less strict than 'Ibadat.

General Prohibitions 
According to muamalat, contracts ...
should not involve the selling or buying of alcohol or any other haram substances. 
should not include any financial deal on the basis of usury (riba)
should not involve gambling (maisir) 
should not involves major uncertainty (minor uncertainty is permissible).

Contracts 
At least one source (a scholar identified as "Barbarti") defines  (contract) as a “legal relationship created by the conjunction of two declarations, from which flow legal consequences with regard to the subject matter”.

The essential elements of a contract are contracting parties (a subject matter ('Ma'aqud Alaih), and a legally binding offer and acceptance. They may be written, verbal or even indicated by signs (in the case of speechless person).

Muamalat contracts are prominent in Islamic banking where they are "fundamental factors" that determine whether a "transaction is valid or not".

Some contracts in Mu'amalat include: 
 Sale Contract; 
 Cost plus profit (murabahah); 
 Debt (al-Qard); 
 Hiring/leasing (al-Ijarah); 
 Lending (al-I'arah); 
 Agency (wakalah); 
 Mortgage (al-Rahn); 
 Partnership (Musharakah); 
 Profit Sharing (Mudarabah).

References

Notes

Citations

Books, documents, etc.

 

Islamic banking
Islamic practices
Arabic words and phrases
Islamic jurisprudence
Islamic banking and finance terminology